Jeanine Bapst (born September 11, 1968) is a Swiss ski mountaineer.

Selected results 
 2001:
 2nd, Swiss Cup, scratch
 2003:
 2nd, Trophée des Gastlosen, together with Maroussia Rusca
 2004:
 2nd, World Championship team race (together with Isabella Crettenand-Moretti)
 3rd, Trophée des Gastlosen, together with Marie Troillet
 2006:
 3rd, Trophée des Gastlosen, together with Gabrielle Magnenat

Patrouille des Glaciers  

 2000: 4th, together with Hélène Romagnoli and Ingrid Maret
 2004: 2nd, together with Andréa Zimmermann and Gabrielle Magnenat

Pierra Menta 

 2003: 7th, together with Annick Rey
 2005: 5th, together with Andréa Zimmermann

External links 
 Jeanine Bapst at Skimountaineering.org

References 

1968 births
Living people
Swiss female ski mountaineers